The 2005 UCLA Bruins softball team represented the University of California, Los Angeles in the 2005 NCAA Division I softball season.  The Bruins were coached by Sue Enquist, in her seventeenth season as head coach.  The Bruins played their home games at Easton Stadium and finished with a record of 40–20.  They competed in the Pacific-10 Conference, where they finished fifth with a 11–10 record.

The Bruins were invited to the 2005 NCAA Division I softball tournament, where they swept the Regional and then completed a run to the title game of the Women's College World Series where they fell to champion Michigan.

Personnel

Roster

Coaches

Schedule

References

UCLA
UCLA Bruins softball seasons
2005 in sports in California
Women's College World Series seasons